Předmíř is a municipality and village in Strakonice District in the South Bohemian Region of the Czech Republic. It has about 300 inhabitants.

Administrative parts
Villages of Metly, Řiště and Zámlyní are administrative parts of Předmíř.

References

Villages in Strakonice District